Emmanuel van de Blaak (born 15 February 2005) is a Dutch footballer who plays for Jong PSV, as a defender.

Early life
Van de Blaak is from Breda. He travelled between Breda and Eindhoven every day whilst playing for PSV.

He has Nigerian origin.

Club career
Van de Blaak spent his early career with Advendo, RKVV JEKA and Willem II, signing for PSV in May 2020.

He made his professional debut for Jong PSV in August 2021, aged 16. He suffered a serious knee injury in November 2021, ruling him out for the rest of the season.

International career
He has represented the Netherlands at under-15 and under-17 youth levels.

References

2005 births
Living people
Dutch people of Nigerian descent
Dutch footballers
Willem II (football club) players
PSV Eindhoven players
Jong PSV players
Eerste Divisie players
Association football defenders
Netherlands youth international footballers